John Duncan Cleworth (born 20 April 1957) is a male British former swimmer.

Information 

Cleworth is a relative of Addin Tyldesley, who competed in the men's 100 metre freestyle event at the 1908 Summer Olympics. Duncan's ancestors were said to be a famous swimming family. Like his family members, he swam at the Tyldesley Swimming and Water Polo Club, where he was later declared one of their most famous members.

Cleworth competed in the men's 400 metre individual medley at the 1976 Summer Olympics.During the Olympics, Duncan announced that he was going to the University of Miami on a swimming scholarship and but ended up leaving the college in 1977.

He represented England in the 100 and 200 metres individual medley events, at the 1978 Commonwealth Games in Edmonton, Alberta, Canada. At the ASA National British Championships he won the 200 metres medley title in 1977 and 1978.

References

External links
 

1957 births
Living people
British male swimmers
Olympic swimmers of Great Britain
Swimmers at the 1976 Summer Olympics
Swimmers at the 1978 Commonwealth Games
Sportspeople from Leigh, Greater Manchester
Commonwealth Games competitors for England
20th-century British people